Mr. Flamingo is a gay bar in Zona Romántica, Puerto Vallarta, in the Mexican state of Jalisco.

Description
Located at Ignacio L. Vallarta and Venustiano Carranza streets, the semi-open air establishment specifically caters to the LGBT community. Amy Ashenden of PinkNews described the bar as "small but very friendly and a seriously popular choice attracting the most mixed crowd" she saw in the city. In 2019, Thrillist's Meagan Drillinger wrote, "For all-night parties, you’ll want Mr. Flamingo, an open-air spot popular with the LGBT community but also completely non-discriminatory. At 7pm it’s a chill, sunset happy-hour bar, but it flips into full-on party mode by 7:30, spills out into the streets, and doesn’t lose momentum until around 3am."

History
Javier Jimenez is the bar's owner. In 2021, Ed Walsh of the San Francisco Chronicle called the bar "wildly popular".

Reception
In 2018, ChicagoPride.com's Jerry Nunn wrote, "Mr. Flamingo is so popular that the dancing continues in the streets surrounding it on Calle Larazo Cardenas. People enjoy the pop music with not a lot of variety most likely because they can sing along, three Shania Twain songs in an hour is a little much but that stopped no one from shaking their tail feathers all night." The bar was described as "always fun" in a 2020 guide published by Moon.

References

External links

 

LGBT drinking establishments in Mexico
Zona Romántica